Qingdao Agricultural University (QAU) is a public university based in Qingdao and Laiyang district of Yantai, Shandong province, China. Founded in 1951 and formerly known as Laiyang Agricultural College, the school was awarded university status in 1999. Most of the majors offered are in the agricultural and engineering sciences. A new campus in Pingdu will be operated in September 2019.

History
Qingdao Agricultural University, formerly known as Laiyang Agricultural College, was founded in 1951.

It was first named Laiyang Agricultural School (June 1951 – September 1958), then Laiyang Agricultural College (September 1958 – September 1963), Laiyang Agricultural School (September 1963 – May 1976), Laiyang Agricultural University (May 1976 – April 1978), Laiyang Agricultural College (April 1978 – March 2007), and finally Qingdao Agricultural University (March 2007 – present).

Campus
 

QAU enjoys three campuses and one farm. Two campuses in Qingdao and the other in Laiyang. The farm in Jiaozhou. They boast ideal geographic location, beautiful sceneries and rich cultures.
For perfect cultural atmosphere, QAU's campus is awarded Shandong Civil Campus.
The campus of QAU covers an area of around 286 ha. with the building floorage of 1.1+ million square meters.

Academic
QAU comprises 22 schools (departments), 77 full-time four-year undergraduate majors or specialities, 13 first-level disciplines of postgraduate programs, 78 second-level disciplines of postgraduate programs and three professional postgraduate programs. QAU has a total enrollment of 35,000, including 1,400 graduate students. QAU Equipment gross is over CNY257+ million. QAU library has a total collection of 2,179,600 books, and 2,486,300 e-books.

QAU has developed herself into a well-balanced comprehensive university, covering sciences, engineering, agriculture, humanities, arts, law, management, economics etc. QAU was awarded EXCELLENT in the National Undergraduate Teaching Assessment of the Ministry of Education. QAU features in science and technology innovation and fruitful achievements. QAU was ranked 34 nationally in the National Higher Learning Institutions Real Income List from Science and Technology Transfer in 2002. QAU topped the other universities in Shandong Province.

Schools and departments

 Agriculture and Plant Protection
 Animal Science and Technology
 Animation and Communication
 Art
 Chemistry and Pharmacy
 Civil Engineering and Architecture
 Continuing Education
 Cooperatives
 Economics and Management
 Food Science and Engineering
 Foreign Languages
 Haidu College
 Horticulture
 Humanities and Social Sciences
 International Education
 Landscaping and Forestry
 Life Sciences
 Marine Science and Engineering
 Mechanical and Electrical Engineering
 Natural Resources and Environment
 Physical Education
 Science and Information Science

References

External links
 Qingdao Agricultural University website 
 Qingdao Agricultural University website 

Universities and colleges in Qingdao
1951 establishments in China
Educational institutions established in 1951